Deebah Farzah Sherazi (born 20 February 1980) is a Pakistani former cricketer who played as an all-rounder. She appeared in two Test matches and nine One Day Internationals for Pakistan between 1997 and 2000.

References

External links
 
 

1980 births
Living people
Place of birth missing (living people)
Pakistan women Test cricketers
Pakistan women One Day International cricketers